TG24 is a box set by industrial music pioneers Throbbing Gristle.

Cassette set
TG24 was originally released as a cassette boxed set in 1980. The set contained the first of Throbbing Gristle's 24 shows in addition to two C90 cassettes taken from a Throbbing Gristle radio interview. The set was presented in a small attache case with a personalised handmade collage and various autographed pictures.

CD set
The box set originally was planned to be released with 24 CDs, however orders from Mute.com included an extra CD. The set contains a total of 26 Throbbing Gristle live performances (IRCD03 has two shows on it). The follow-up boxset, TG+ contains an additional 10 live performances.

Box set includes the following items: certificate of authenticity, wax sealed envelope, two patches, three stickers, four pictures of Throbbing Gristle, four collage prints (1 of 2 made by each member of the band specifically for this release), three button badges and a newsletter with a history of the group and the track listing of the box set.

CD information
Dates given in Year-Month-Day format.
 IRCD02: 1976-10-18 – UK-London – I.C.A. [this includes a hidden track, with parts of radio about 'Prostitution' with Genesis P. Orridge, probably from JJJ Radio, Sydney, interviewer: Bruce Elder, 1978]
 IRCD03:
1. 1976-07-06 – UK-England-London – Air Gallery
2. 1976-08-21 – UK-England-Winchester – Hat Fair
 IRCD04: 1977-02-11 – Nags Head – High Wycombe
 IRCD05: 1977-03-26 – Brighton Polytechnic
 IRCD06: 1977-05-07 – Southampton – Nuffield Theatre
 IRCD07: 1977-05-22 – UK-London – Rat Club, Pindar
 IRCD08: 1977-09-29 – UK-London – Highbury Roundhouse
 IRCD09: 1977-11-11 – Winchester Art School
 IRCD10: 1977-12-17 – UK-London – Rat Club, Pinda
 IRCD11: 1978-02-25 – Brighton Polytechnic
 IRCD12: 1978-03-03 – UK-London – Architectural Association
 IRCD13: 1978-05-18 – UK-London – Goldsmiths College
 IRCD14: 1978-07-01 – Wakefield – Industrial Training College
 IRCD15: 1978-07-06 – UK-London – London Film-Makers' Co-op
 IRCD16: 1978-12-11 – UK-London – Cryptic One Club
 IRCD17: 1979-01-21 – UK-London – Centro Iberico
 IRCD18: 1979-04-12 – Derby – Ajanta Cinema
 IRCD19: 1979-04-25 – Sheffield University
 IRCD20: 1979-05-19 – Manchester – The Factory
 IRCD21: 1979-05-26 – Northampton – Guild Hall
 IRCD22: 1979-08-03 – UK-London – Y.M.C.A.
 IRCD24: 1979-12-23 – UK-London – Butlers Wharf
 IRCD25: 1980-02-24 – Leeds – Fan Club
 IRCD26: 1980-02-29 – UK-London – Scala Cinema (this CD was only included with orders from Mute.com)
 IRCD29: 1980-03-13 – Goldsmiths College

Cassette information

Live

Other

1 Hour Sample
Previous to the release of the TG24 boxset, a sampler titled TG24 1 Hour Sample was released for promotion. The CD was available via Mute Records carrying the dual catalogue number: IRCD--/PTG60CD. The CD was compiled by Olivier Cormier Otano and edited on Pro Tools by Anne Carruthers.

See also
Throbbing Gristle live

External links 
 
 The Guardian article on the release

2002 live albums
2002 compilation albums
Throbbing Gristle compilation albums
Throbbing Gristle live albums